Paratrichophaea is a genus of fungi in the family Pyronemataceae.

External links
Index Fungorum

Pyronemataceae
Pezizales genera